Giannina Facio, Lady Scott (born Giannina Facio Franco; September 10, 1955), is a Costa Rican actress who has appeared in a number of films, especially those of her husband, British film director and producer Sir Ridley Scott. She first worked with Scott on White Squall and has been his partner since Hannibal. Gladiator was the first of two films in which she plays the wife of Russell Crowe's character, the other being Body of Lies. Since White Squall, Facio has made appearances in all of Scott's films except for American Gangster and The Martian.

Biography 
She was born as Giannina Facio Franco on September 10, 1955, in San José, Costa Rica to lawyer, politician and diplomat Gonzalo Facio Segreda (1918–2018) and his second wife Ana Franco Calzia. She has two sisters, Ana Catalina and Carla. She also has three older half-siblings from her father's first marriage: Sandra, Alda and Rómulo (whose mother is María Lilia Montejo Ortuño).

Personal life
Facio married her producing partner Sir Ridley Scott in June 2015; they had been dating since 2000. Ridley has cast her in all his films since White Squall in 1996 except for American Gangster and The Martian.

Filmography

As actress

As producer
 Matchstick Men (2003) – co-producer
 Tristan & Isolde (2006)
 Concussion (2015)
 Mark Felt: The Man Who Brought Down the White House (2017)
 House of Gucci (2021)

References

External links

1955 births
Living people
Actresses from San José, Costa Rica
Costa Rican film actresses
Costa Rican expatriates in England
Costa Rican people of Italian descent
Giannina
Wives of knights